A High Council of State (in Dutch: Hoog College van Staat) is a Council of which the independence is guaranteed in the Constitution of the Netherlands. There are five High Councils of State: the Senate and House of Representatives, the Dutch Council of State, the Court of Audit and the National Ombudsman.

References

Government of the Netherlands
High Councils of State